André Zacharow (7 July 1939  10 September 2021) was a Brazilian economist, lawyer, academic, and politician who served as a Federal Deputy from Paraná.

Biography
Zacharow was born in Jaguariaíva, Paraná. He was a graduate of the Federal University of Paraná.

He served as a member of the Chamber of Deputies from 2003 to 2015. He was originally elected as a member of PDT, but finished his term as a member of MDB.

Zacharow died from COVID-19 in September 2021, amid the COVID-19 pandemic in Brazil.

References

1939 births
2021 deaths
Brazilian economists
20th-century Brazilian lawyers
Brazilian academics
Brazilian politicians
Members of the Chamber of Deputies (Brazil) from Paraná
Federal University of Paraná alumni
People from Paraná (state)
Deaths from the COVID-19 pandemic in Paraná (state)